Popular National Party may refer to:

 Popular National Party (Quebec), Canada
 Popular National Party (Tanzania)